The Right Stuff is a dating service in New Jersey, in business since 1993. Membership is international, and limited to single students, graduates, and faculty, of medical schools, and of select universities and colleges.  TIME Magazine mentioned it in a review of dating services, saying, "If you’re highly educated and seeking a highly educated partner, Right Stuff Dating ('The Ivy League of Dating') may be right for you."  According to the Right Stuff web site, as of 2015, there are about 4,900 members, and 310 couples have met and married through the site.

History and membership
The Right Stuff conducted business via paper and United States postal service beginning in 1993.  It advertised in magazines such as The New Yorker, Boston, New York, Chicago, and Philadelphia magazines, similar publications in Washington D.C., and California, and university alumni magazines for the target universities.  The Right Stuff went to the web in 1997.

Originally, membership was limited to affiliates of Ivy League, the Seven Sisters, MIT, Duke, Northwestern, Stanford, 
Berkeley, Chicago, and Johns Hopkins.  Over time, the list of eligible universities has expanded to about 70 top-tier schools, and any medical school.

Competing niche sites targeting high intelligence or graduates of elite universities have either closed entirely, no longer work with current browsers, or are otherwise essentially moribund.  These include docdates.com, fastcupid.com, intellectconnect.com, ivydate.com, mymitra.com, and sweetongeeks.com.

Mechanics of site
As of July 2015, a six-month membership costs $75.00. The membership is discounted for full-time students, recent graduates, and residents of certain states. The Right Stuff requires its members to provide proof of student, graduate, or faculty relationship to one of the listed universities or medical schools.

New members submit two write-ups.  The first is a short 35-to-50 word profile, which is visible to all members of the opposite sex. The second is an extended one-page biography that gives a more detailed description of the member's personality and preferences. Members are given web search access to the short 35-to-50 word profiles of other members.  Based on that search, members may order one-page extended biographies for $3.10 each.  Members may initiate communication through an intra-site email system, which allows members to remain anonymous until they choose to reveal more.

References

External sources
 Dr. Christie Hartmann, Niche Online Dating Sites for Intellectual Badasses (January 2014)
 Richard Kostalanetz, Why Internet Dating, New English Review (June 2013)

1993 establishments in New Jersey
Online dating services of the United States